Quiapo is a district of the city of Manila, in the National Capital Region of the Philippines. Referred to as the "Old Downtown of Manila", Quiapo is home to the Quiapo Church, where the feast of the Black Nazarene is held with millions of people attending annually. Quiapo has also made a name for itself as a place for marketplace bargain hunting.

Quiapo is geographically located at the very center of the city of Manila. It is bounded by the Pasig River and Estero de San Miguel to the south, San Miguel to the east, Recto Avenue to the north and Rizal Avenue to the west.

Etymology
Quiapo's name is derived from the abundance of water cabbage (Pistia stratiotes), called kiyapo in Tagalog (spelled quiapo in Philippine Spanish) in the nearby Pasig River. The town of Cuyapo in Nueva Ecija is also named after the same plant.

History 
Since the American insular government and commonwealth periods through to the late 1970s, Quiapo shared its status as the center of the activities of Manila's social elites as well as trade, fashion, art and higher learning with its surrounding vicinity (Avenida Rizal, Santa Cruz, Escolta and the University Belt). However, with the construction of the Manila Light Rail Transit System's LRT-1 spanning over Rizal Avenue, the occlusion of light, the trapping of smog and vehicle emissions left the streets beneath dark, gloomy and with an increase in crime and transients.  Consequently, many long-time establishments vacated the area.  Following the People Power Revolution in 1986, the vibrancy of Quiapo further diminished, with the void filled by makeshift markets to accommodate visitors to the Quiapo Church.

Community 
Plaza Miranda, in the heart of the Quiapo district, is a town square named after Jose Sandino y Miranda, who served as secretary of the treasury of the Philippines from 1853 to 1863. It is located in front of the Quiapo Church, and has become a popular site for political rallies. On August 21, 1971, while the Liberal Party held its miting de avance in the plaza, a bomb exploded, killing nine and injuring almost 100 civilians.

The Quiapo district is also home to a sizable Muslim population. The Golden Mosque and Green Mosque are located here.

Stores offering herbal products, and a large population of self-described fortune tellers, surround the Quiapo church. Thievery and sales of illegally copied media are prevalent in the district.

In recent years, the local government of Manila, spearheaded by then-Mayor Lito Atienza, launched the Buhayin ang Maynila ("Revitalize Manila") project which greatly rehabilitated Quiapo and its vicinities, most especially Plaza Miranda, Quinta Market, the Arsenio Lacson Underpass and the University Belt. Parts of Rizal Avenue, starting from Carriedo Street to Recto Avenue, were converted into pedestrian shopping arcades.

Barangays

Quiapo contains 16 barangays: Barangays 306, 307,308, and 309 are part of Zone 30; Barangays 383, 384, 385, 386, 387, and 388 are part of Zone 39; and Barangays 389, 390, 391, 392, 393, and 394 are part of Zone 40 of the City of Manila.

Gallery

Notable people
 Julio Nakpil
 Rosemarie Gil

See also
 Hidalgo Street

References

External links

 
Districts of Manila